Odontobunus is a genus of harvestmen in the family Phalangiidae.

Species
 Odontobunus africanus Roewer, 1910
 Odontobunus armatus (Sørensen, 1910)
 Odontobunus elegans (Roewer, 1956)
 Odontobunus kenianus Roewer, 1957
 Odontobunus lelupi (Roewer, 1961)
 Odontobunus longipes (Lawrence, 1963)
 Odontobunus niger (Roewer, 1956)
 Odontobunus punctatus (Roewer, 1956)
 Odontobunus pupillaris (Lawrence, 1963)

References

Harvestmen
Harvestman genera